Richard William Farnsworth (September 1, 1920 – October 6, 2000) was an American actor and stuntman. He was twice nominated for an  Academy Award: in 1978 for Best Supporting Actor for Comes a Horseman, and in 2000 for Best Actor in The Straight Story, making him the oldest nominee for the award at the time. Farnsworth was also known for his performances in The Grey Fox (1982), for which he received a Golden Globe Award nomination for Best Actor in a Motion Picture - Drama, as well as Anne of Green Gables (1985); Sylvester (1985), and Misery (1990).

Early life
Farnsworth was born on September 1, 1920, in Los Angeles, California. His mother was a homemaker and his father was an engineer.

Career

Farnsworth gradually moved into acting in Western movies. He made uncredited appearances in numerous films, including Gone with the Wind (1939), Red River (1948), The Wild One (1953), and The Ten Commandments (1956). In 1960, credited as Dick Farnsworth, he appeared as a Gault ranch hand in the "Street of Hate" episode of the TV Western Laramie.

He received his first acting credit in 1963 and went on to act in Western films and television shows. He had a role in Roots (1977) and co-starred with Wilford Brimley in The Boys of Twilight (1992). His breakthrough came when he played stagecoach robber Bill Miner in the 1982 Canadian film,The Grey Fox. He appeared as a baseball coach in The Natural (1984). In 1985, he was the brother to Marilla and father figure to Anne in Anne of Green Gables and starred as a soft-spoken, sage cowboy with horse training wisdom for Melissa Gilbert in Sylvester. His other prominent roles included a wealthy and ruthless oil man in The Two Jakes (1990) and the suspicious sheriff in the film version of Stephen King's Misery (1990).

Personal life and death
Farnsworth had a long marriage and had two children. After becoming a widower, he lived on a ranch in Lincoln, New Mexico.

On the night of October 6, 2000, suffering from terminal cancer that left him partially paralyzed and in great pain, Farnsworth died from a self-inflicted gunshot wound at his ranch in Lincoln, New Mexico.

Awards and nominations

Comes a Horseman (1979)
 National Board of Review Award for Best Supporting Actor (won)
 National Society of Film Critics Award for Best Supporting Actor (won, tied with Robert Morley in Who Is Killing the Great Chefs of Europe?)
 Academy Award for Best Supporting Actor (nominated)
 New York Film Critics Circle Award for Best Supporting Actor (runner-up)

The Grey Fox (1982)
 Genie Award for Best Performance by a Foreign Actor (won)
 London Film Critics' Circle Award for Actor of the Year (won, tied with James Mason in The Shooting Party)
 Taormina Film Fest: Golden Mask (won)
 Golden Globe Award for Best Actor – Motion Picture Drama (nominated)

Anne of Green Gables (1985)
 Gemini Award for Best Performance by a Supporting Actor (won)

Chase (1985)
 Golden Globe Award for Best Supporting Actor – Series, Miniseries or Television Film (nominated)

The Straight Story (1999)
 Ft. Lauderdale International Film Festival Award for Best Actor (won)
 Independent Spirit Award for Best Male Lead (won)
 New York Film Critics Circle Award for Best Actor (won)
 Academy Award for Best Actor (nominated)
 Chicago Film Critics Association Award for Best Actor (nominated)
 Golden Globe Award for Best Actor – Motion Picture Drama (nominated)
 Las Vegas Film Critics Society Award for Best Actor (nominated)
 Los Angeles Film Critics Association Award for Best Actor (runner-up)
 Online Film Critics Society Award for Best Actor (nominated)
 Satellite Award for Best Actor Motion Picture – Drama (nominated)
 Southeastern Film Critics Association Award for Best Actor (runner-up)

Note: Farnsworth was inducted into the Hall of Great Western Performers at the National Cowboy & Western Heritage Museum in Oklahoma City, Oklahoma, in 1997. In addition, Farnsworth received a Hollywood Walk of Fame star for his contributions in the motion pictures on August 17, 1992; the star is located at 1560 Vine Street.

Filmography

Television

References

Further reading

External links
 
 
 
 Richard Farnsworth: The Man Who Talked Straight at Moviecrazed.com
 The Cowboy Kind Farnsworth wrote the foreword to this book by Darrell Arnold. Published posthumously in 2001.
 1999 Disney Press Kit For The Straight Story with publicity photos
 1998 Des Moines Register Article
 The Straight Story on Lynch Net Complete Film notes, interviews, photographs, audio and trailers 1999
 Obituary Cowboy's Way by Jeff Jensen, 2000

1920 births
2000 deaths
American male film actors
American male television actors
Suicides by firearm in New Mexico
Best Performance by a Foreign Actor Genie Award winners
Independent Spirit Award for Best Male Lead winners
Male actors from Los Angeles
Male Western (genre) film actors
American stunt performers
20th-century American male actors
2000 suicides
Best Supporting Actor in a Drama Series Canadian Screen Award winners